Mark Island may refer to:

 Mark Island (Frobisher Bay, Nunavut)
 Mark Island (Hudson Strait, Nunavut)

See also
 Little Mark Island, northern Casco Bay, Maine, location of the Little Mark Island Monument